Give Me Your Heart is ROMEO's debut Japanese single. It is Park Jung-min's first release as ROMEO. There is one normal edition and two limited editions, one of which includes a bonus DVD.

Track listing

Normal edition

Limited editions

Music videos
 "Give Me Your Heart"

Release history

Charts

References

External links
 
 

SS501 songs
2012 singles
Japanese-language songs
Songs written by Jeff Miyahara
Victor Entertainment singles
Songs written by Erik Lidbom